The 1950 World Fencing Championships were held in Monte Carlo, Monaco.

Medal table

Medal summary

Men's events

Women's events

References

1950 in fencing
1950 in Monégasque sport
F
Sport in Monte Carlo
World Fencing Championships
Fencing competitions in Monaco